Juan Maria Antonio Rivera (also spelled Ribera) was an 18th-century Spanish explorer who explored southwestern North America, including parts of the Southern Rocky Mountains. In 1765, at the request of Governor Tomás Vélez Cachupin of New Mexico, he led an expedition from Santa Fe northward through present-day Utah and Colorado, partly in search of silver but also to help thwart the expansion of European powers in the region. His expedition passed through regions inhabited by the Ute and Southern Paiute tribes. His expedition crossed the Animas River near present-day Durango, Colorado (a tributary of the Colorado River), which he may have named. The ore samples he brought back to Santa Fe were among the first recorded discoveries of gold in present-day Colorado, although they created no particular interest at the time.

See also
Colorado Gold Rush

References 

Jacobs, G. C. 1992. "The Phantom Pathfinder" Utah Historical Quarterly 60(3): 201 - 223.

External links
Utah History to Go: The Rivera Expedition

People of pre-statehood Colorado
People of pre-statehood Utah
18th-century Spanish people
Year of death unknown
Spanish explorers of North America
Explorers of the colonial Southwest of the present United States
18th-century explorers
Year of birth unknown